Hasan Çelebi, born 1937 in Erzurum, Turkey, is a Turkish master of Islamic calligraphy. He is a student of Hamid Aytaç.

Çelebi has devoted his whole life to calligraphy, and has been described by Caryle Murphy of The Washington Post as one "of the most celebrated masters of classical Ottoman calligraphy style". His work was included in an exhibition of Iranian and Turkish calligraphy at the Saba Institute in Tehran. His former student, Mohammed Zakariya, is an American master calligrapher who lectures in the USA and in the Middle East.

See also
 Soraya Syed, a British Islamic calligrapher and artist, and one of Hasan Celebi's students
 Hasan Çelebi (Ottoman era), a disciple of Ahmed Karahisari

References

External links
 Hatvesanat.com (mainly )
 Calligraphers' Biographies (mainly )

1937 births
Living people
People from Erzurum
Turkish calligraphers